This is a list of heritage railways in Switzerland. For convenience, the list includes any pre-World War II railway in the large sense of the term (either adhesion railway, rack railway or funicular) currently operated with at least several original or historical carriages.

Switzerland has a very dense rail network, both standard and narrow gauge. The overwhelming majority of railways, built between the mid-19th and early 20th century, are still in regular operation today and were electrified earlier than in the rest of Europe. The major exception is the partially rack and pinion-operated Furka Steam Railway, the longest unelectrified line in the country. However, numerous rail operators, notably SBB Historic, provide services with well-maintained historical rolling stock.

List

 (adhesion)
Blonay–Chamby museum railway (adhesion)
Brienz Rothorn Railway (rack)
Dampfbahn-Verein Zürcher Oberland (adhesion)
 (funicular)
Furka Steam Railway (rack and adhesion)
 (adhesion)
Giessbachbahn (funicular)
Heimwehfluhbahn (funicular)
International Rhine Regulation Railway (adhesion)
La Traction (adhesion)
Les Avants–Sonloup (funicular)
Montreux–Glion–Rochers-de-Naye railway (rack)
Montreux Oberland Bernois Railway (adhesion)
 (adhesion)
Pilatus Railway (rack)
Reichenbachfall Funicular
Rhaetian Railway, notably on the Albula and Bernina lines (adhesion)
Riffelalp tram (adhesion)
Rigi Railways (rack)
Rorschach–Heiden railway (rack)
SBB Historic (adhesion)
 (adhesion)
Schynige Platte Railway (rack)
Sonnenberg (funicular)
 (funicular)
Vapeur Val-de-Travers (adhesion)
 (adhesion)
Zürcher Museums-Bahn (adhesion)

See also
List of railway museums in Switzerland
List of narrow-gauge railways in Switzerland
List of mountain railways in Switzerland
List of funiculars in Switzerland
Lists of tourist attractions in Switzerland

References

 
Switzerland